James A. Fritsche (December 10, 1931 – February 28, 2019) was an American professional basketball player. Fritsche was selected in the first round of the 1953 NBA draft (7th overall) by the Minneapolis Lakers after a collegiate career at Hamline University. He played two seasons for three teams, the Lakers, Baltimore Bullets and Fort Wayne Pistons.

Fritsche died on February 28, 2019, at age 87.

References

1931 births
2019 deaths
American men's basketball players
Baltimore Bullets (1944–1954) players
Basketball players from Saint Paul, Minnesota
Centers (basketball)
Fort Wayne Pistons players
Hamline Pipers men's basketball players
Minneapolis Lakers draft picks
Minneapolis Lakers players
Power forwards (basketball)